Shahrak-e Seyyed ol Shohada (also Romanized as Shahrak-e Seyyed ol Shohadā and Shahrak-e Seyyed Osh Shohadā) is a village in Balesh Rural District, in the Central District of Darab County, Fars Province, Iran. At the 2006 census, its population was 189, in 49 families.

References 

Populated places in Darab County